Douglas Hancock Cooper Johnston (October 16, 1856 – June 28, 1939, Chickasaw), also known as "Douglas Henry Johnston", was a tribal leader who served as the last elected governor of the Chickasaw Nation from 1898 to 1902. He was re-elected in 1904 and, after the Dawes Act changed how tribal lands were allocated and regulated in Indian Territory to allow statehood in 1907, he was appointed by President Theodore Roosevelt in 1906 as governor of the tribe under federal authority. He served until his death in office in 1939. 

In office, he was notable for ratifying the Atoka Agreement, which allotted communal tribal lands to individual households. In the 1920s he successfully sued the federal government in the US Court of Claims, to recover monies illegally obtained from tribal resources. Prior to his election as governor, he was the superintendent of Bloomfield Academy, a Chickasaw girls' boarding school. From 1902 to 1904, he served in the Chickasaw Senate. President Theodore Roosevelt reappointed him as Governor of the Chickasaw after the Dawes Act changed how tribal lands were allocated and regulated in Indian Territory in an effort to push assimilation and prepare for statehood.

Family background
Johnston was the son of Mary Ann Cheadle Walker (1818 – c. 1863, Chickasaw), and her husband, "Colonel" John Johnston, Sr., who was European American. The third of four sons, he was born in Skullyville, Indian Territory, when it was the capital of the Choctaw Nation. In the Chickasaw matrilineal kinship system, children were considered born into their mother's clan and took their status from her. Johnston's name is sometimes given as "Douglas Henry Johnston", but he was named for General Douglas Hancock Cooper. He had two elder brothers, William Worth Johnston and Franklin Pierce Johnston, and one younger, Napoleon Bonapart [sic] Johnston.

Early life
Douglas Johnston was educated in the Bloomfield Academy and the Chickasaw Manual Labor Academy, established in 1867. Before he was nine years old, both his parents had died. The orphaned boy was raised by an older half-brother, Tandy C. Walker, the son of his mother and her first husband, Lewis Walker.

Growing up, Johnston worked as a farmer and stockman.

Career

Superintendent of Bloomfield Academy
In 1882, Johnston was appointed as Superintendent of the Bloomfield Seminary, a missionary boarding school for Chickasaw girls funded by the Chickasaw Nation and the Methodist Church. He was completing the term of the previous Superintendent, Robert Boyd. The academy had been modeled on Mt. Holyoke Seminary of Massachusetts. During his tenure, the school prospered. Johnston helped popularize European-American style education among the Chickasaw.

Governor of Chickasaw Nation
In 1898 the Chickasaw National Party nominated Johnston as its candidate for governor. He won a decisive victory over Hindman H. Burris, and served as governor of the Chickasaw Nation until 1902. His mansion near the present community of Emet, Oklahoma, served as the "Chickasaw White House." This residence was listed on the National Register of Historic Places in 1971.

Although his political critics claimed that he lived lavishly at tribal expense and indicted him in 1905, Johnston was acquitted of the charge.

In 1897, during Johnston's term, the Chickasaw Nation ratified the Atoka Agreement, to allow allotment of communal lands to individual households of tribal members under the Dawes Act. This was part of the United States plan to extinguish tribal land claims in order to assimilate Native Americans to the majority model and to enable admission of the territory as a state.

Johnston lobbied Washington politicians into passing the Supplemental Agreement of 1902 to modify this treaty, in order to allow the Chickasaw and Choctaw to review tribal citizenship cases that had been accepted by the Dawes Commission. The Citizenship Court rejected nearly four thousand claims that it found false and saved the two nations about $20 million. When it came time to allot tribal lands to individuals, Johnston had to review and sign each claim. Former Oklahoma Governor William H. Murray in his eulogy of Johnston on June 29, 1939, said:

Johnston was reelected to office in 1904. This was the last election under the traditional Chickasaw Nation government. When the Chickasaw Nation was dissolved in 1906 as a prelude to Oklahoma being admitted as a state, President Theodore Roosevelt appointed him as governor of his people. He served in that position until his death in 1939. In 1907, the legislature of the newly created state of Oklahoma tried to nullify a provision of the Atoka Agreement that prohibited taxing for 21 years the lands allotted to Native American heads of household. Johnston led the court fight against the state. The US Supreme Court upheld the provision in 1912.

In 1924, the Johnston administration won permission to sue the Federal government in the United States Court of Claims and recover money that it had obtained illegally from tribal resources.

Legacy and honors
In 1907, Johnston County, Oklahoma was named after him. 
In 1931 he was inducted into the Oklahoma Hall of Fame.
His residence, known as the White House of the Chickasaw, was listed on the National Register of Historic Places.
In 1997 Johnston was posthumously inducted into the Chickasaw Hall of Fame.

The following memorial to Douglas H. Johnston was published in the Chronicles of Oklahoma:

Personal life
In 1881, he married Nellie Bynum, a Chickasaw woman of partial European descent. They had two sons and one daughter together. Nellie died of tuberculosis in 1886. A few years later, in 1889 Johnston married Lorena Elizabeth "Betty" Harper, also of Chickasaw/European ancestry. They had a daughter together, Wahneta (sometimes recorded as "Juanita") Elizabeth Johnston.

Johnston was an uncle of Chickasaw performer Te Ata Fisher. 

Douglas Johnston died on June 28, 1939. He was buried in Tishomingo City Cemetery in Tishomingo, Oklahoma, the historic capital of the Chickasaw Nation.

Notes

References

Sources
 O'Beirne, Harry F.; Leaders and Leading Men of the Indian Territory, Choctaw and Chickasaw (1891).
 O'Beirne, Harry F., and E. S. O'Beirne; The Indian Territory, Its Chiefs, Legislators and Leading Men (1892).
 Cornish, Melvin; "Douglas H. Johnston", Chronicles of Oklahoma v18 (1940) #1 (March).
Lovegrove, Michael. A Nation in Transition: Douglas Henry Johnston and the Chickasaws, 1898-1939, Chickasaw Nation, 2009 
 Parke, Franke E, with J.W. LeFlore; "Some of Our Choctaw Neighborhood Schools", Chronicles of Oklahoma v4 (1926) #2 (June).
 Williams, Chad; "Johnston, Douglas Henry (1856-1939)", Encyclopedia of Oklahoma History & Culture

External links
Governor Douglas H. Johnston Profile & Videos - Chickasaw.TV
 

1856 births
1939 deaths
19th-century Native Americans
20th-century Native Americans
Governors of the Chickasaw Nation
People from Le Flore County, Oklahoma
People of Indian Territory
Pre-statehood history of Oklahoma